Yemi Blaq born Folayemi Olatunji  is a Nigerian film actor, songwriter and model.

Early life and education 
Yemi was born to Mr Olatunji Blaq in Ondo State, Nigeria. Yemi Blaq was raised in Lagos where he attended and completed his primary and tertiary education. He attended Adeyemi Demonstration Secondary school in Ondo, Ondo state, and he was the school’s first Head boy. He started acting during his high school days and continued till date.

Career 
Yemi Blaq started his professional career in Nollywood in 2005. He had registered with the Actors Guild of Nigeria back then in order to be an actor. His first movie that brought him to limelight was Lost of Lust where he acted alongside Mercy Johnson. After his first movie, he was sought out for in the Nigerian movie industry and has since acted several movies.

Filmography 

 The Good Samaritan 2 (2004)
 Without Shame (2005)
 Lost to Lust (2005)
 11 Days 11 Nights 2 (2005)
 Traumatised (2006)
Total Control (2006)
Sting (2006)
Mamush (2006)
Desperate Ambition (2006)
Sinking Sands (2011)
Strive (2013)
President for a Day (2014)
The Last 3 Digits (2015)
Cultural Clash (2019)
12 Noon (completed)
Shadow Parties (2020)

Awards

References 

1978 births
Living people
Nigerian male film actors
Nigerian film award winners
People from Ondo State
Nigerian songwriters
Nigerian male models
Actors from Ondo State
Yoruba actors